Lampranthus sociorum is a species of plants in the family Aizoaceae.

Synonym 
 Mesembryanthemum sociorum L.Bolus

References 
 Aluka entry
 ZipcodeZoo entry
 Gard. Chron. 1930, Ser. III. lxxxvii. 212.
 Cornelia Klak, Terry A. Hedderson and H. Peter Linder, "A Molecular Systematic Study of the Lampranthus Group (Aizoaceae) Based on the Chloroplast TrnL-trnF and Nuclear ITS and 5S NTS Sequence Data", Systematic Botany, Vol. 28, No. 1 (Jan. - Mar., 2003), pp. 70–85.

sociorum
Taxa named by Louisa Bolus
Taxa named by N. E. Brown